Desert prickly pear is a common name for several plants and may refer to:

 Opuntia engelmannii, native to the United States and northern Mexico
 Opuntia phaeacantha